The Gorgas–Manly Historic District is a historic district that includes  and eight buildings on the campus of the University of Alabama in Tuscaloosa, Alabama.  The buildings represent the university campus as it existed from the establishment of the institution through to the late 19th century.  Two buildings included in the district, Gorgas House and the Little Round House, are among only seven structures to have survived the burning of the campus by the Union Army, under the command of Brigadier General John T. Croxton, on April 4, 1865.  The other survivors were the President's Mansion and the Old Observatory, plus a few faculty residences.

Woods Hall was the first building constructed following the American Civil War.  The remaining five buildings, Clark, Manly, Garland, Tuomey and Barnard Halls, represent campus construction during the economic recovery that followed the end of the Reconstruction era.

The district

Gorgas House

An example of the Greek Revival style, the Gorgas House was the first building built on the campus of the university.  Designed by William Nichols, designer of the original campus and Tuscaloosa's Old Alabama State Capitol, it was completed in 1829, prior to the opening of the campus.  The main facade, minus the portico, reflects the continuing influence of the Federal style.  Initially used as a guest house for visitors and professors and as a dining hall for students, it was converted to use as a faculty residence in 1847.  The house gained its current name from Josiah Gorgas, the eighth University of Alabama president.  Ill health forced him to resign as president and the trustees allowed the Gorgas family to move into the house, which also contained the campus post office and student hospital. The building was dedicated as a memorial to the family in 1944 by the Alabama legislature, and then became one of the University of Alabama museums now known as the Gorgas House Museum upon the death of the last two surviving Gorgas children in 1953.

Little Round House

This small octagonal building with crenelations originally served as the guard house of the university.  
It was completed in 1860 and reflected the conversion of the university into a military campus.  The conversion occurred on February 23, 1860, by an act of the Alabama legislature.  As tensions between North and South escalated, the request for the transition came from the university president of the time, Landon Garland.  Ironically, the Little Round House, despite its military associations, was one of the few structures that remained after Federal troops burned the campus.  When the university reopened its doors in 1871 the building was used as a physician's office.  A few years later, while in a deteriorated condition, the building was considered for demolition.  It was saved by the university trustees and converted into a records repository.  It became known as Jasons Shrine during the 1930s, while being used by the Jasons, a men's honor society.  1990 saw the structure converted into a memorial for all of the honor societies.

Woods Hall

Woods Hall was the first new building on campus following the Civil War.  Constructed from 1867 to 1868, the four-story brick structure was built with a Gothic Revival arcade on the ground floor, end facades in the Gothic Revival style with a crenelated roof, and cast iron galleries on the central upper floors.  Initially known simply as "the barracks," it was used as a dormitory.  It also had a dining hall and classrooms on the ground floor. It remained a dormitory until 1961, when it was converted for use by the Department of Art and Art History.

The area between Woods Hall on the one side and Garland, Clark, and Manly on the other side is known as Woods Quad.

Clark Hall
Built in 1884, the Gothic Revival-style Clark Hall was constructed on the site of the old Lyceum, destroyed during the Civil War. Clark was originally designed as an all-purpose building with a library, reading rooms, chapel, and a large public meeting room, which served as "the great public hall of the University." By 1910 the building was beginning to deteriorate and the brick walls were near collapse by the late 1940s, due to the heavy roof. The hall was saved by the erection of an interior steel frame within the building, preserving it for future generations. The building was restored again in the 1980s. It was named for Willis G. Clark, a university trustee.

Clark Hall contains the main office space for the College of Arts and Sciences, as well as a dance studio (currently overseen by Cornelius Carter).

Manly Hall

Manly Hall is a -story Gothic Revival structure in red brick.  Similar in design to Clark Hall, it was finished in 1885.  Originally built as a dormitory, it now houses the Department of Religious Studies, the Department of Women's Studies, offices of the English department, and the office of the literary magazine Black Warrior Review. It was named in honor of Basil Manly, the second university president.

Garland Hall
The three-story Garland Hall is another Gothic Revival–style building on campus, built in 1887 to house a dormitory and the first incarnation of the Alabama Museum of Natural History. It is the "counterpart" of Manly Hall, and today houses the Sarah Moody Gallery of Art.

Tuomey Hall
The -story Tuomey Hall, now known as the Blount Undergraduate Initiative Tuomey Academic House, was completed in 1889.  Built as a laboratory for the Department of Chemistry, it was named in honor of Michael Tuomey, state geologist and professor.  Toumey Hall was previously the home of Army ROTC at the University of Alabama.

Barnard Hall
The -story Barnard Hall, now known as Oliver-Barnard Hall, was completed in 1889. Built as a laboratory and gymnasium, it now houses offices and classrooms for the College of Arts and Sciences.  It was named for scientist and professor, Frederick A. P. Barnard.  It was rededicated as Oliver-Barnard Hall in 2000 in honor of John T. Oliver Jr., trustee emeritus. Barnard Hall was previously the home of Air Force ROTC at the University of Alabama.

See also
National Register of Historic Places listings in Tuscaloosa County, Alabama

References

External links

 Gorgas House - official site
  

Federal architecture in Alabama
Greek Revival architecture in Alabama
Gothic Revival architecture in Alabama
University of Alabama
William Nichols buildings
National Register of Historic Places in Tuscaloosa County, Alabama
Buildings and structures in Tuscaloosa, Alabama
Historic districts in Tuscaloosa County, Alabama
Historic American Buildings Survey in Alabama
Historic districts on the National Register of Historic Places in Alabama
1971 establishments in Alabama
Tourist attractions in Tuscaloosa, Alabama